Pedro Simão Aquino de Araújo (born 16 March 1928) was a Brazilian footballer. He played in seven matches for the Brazil national football team in 1949, scoring five goals. He was also part of Brazil's squad for the 1949 South American Championship.

References

External links
 

1928 births
Possibly living people
Brazilian footballers
Brazil international footballers
Place of birth missing (living people)
Association footballers not categorized by position